Ringkjøbing Amt (English, Ringkjøbing County) is a former county (Danish: amt) on the Jutland peninsula in western Denmark. It had the lowest population density of all the Danish counties. The county was abolished effective January 1, 2007, when it merged into Region Midtjylland (i.e. Region Central Jutland).

Note of terminology: A modern Danish spelling of the name would be Ringkøbing Amt, but the county officially used an older, traditional spelling, as opposed to the municipality of Ringkøbing.

List of County Mayors

Municipalities (1970-2006)

Former counties of Denmark (1970–2006)
Central Denmark Region